Elides may refer to
The action of elision, omitting one or more sounds, in linguistics
The descendants of Eli the priest in the Hebrew Bible